Alexander England is an Australian actor. He comes from Albury in New South Wales, where he attended Scots School Albury.

England starred opposite Lupita Nyong'o and Josh Gad in the 2019 zombie comedy horror film Little Monsters.

Career
Alexander England was selected to play Tony Greig, a former captain of the English cricket team known in Australia for his cricketing commentary, in 2012 for the television miniseries Howzat! Kerry Packer's War. To copy Greig's distinctive accent, England listened to commentary recordings.

In 2016, England was cast to play Harry Crewe in the Australian television series Offspring. Joining the show in season 6, England said "Offspring is a really interesting show tonally. It can swing from the extreme height of comedy to serious tragedy within one episode.I knew I was going to have to pay attention to what was going on around me and really respond it."

Filmography

Film

Television

Theatre

Awards and nominations

References

External links
 

21st-century Australian male actors
Australian male film actors
Australian male stage actors
Australian male television actors
Living people
Place of birth missing (living people)
Year of birth missing (living people)